Marco Gonzalez is a Maya archaeological site located near the southern tip of Ambergris Caye off the coast of Belize. It was first recorded in 1984 by Drs. Elizabeth Graham and David M. Pendergast, and was named by them after their local guide.

The site was excavated by Drs. Graham and Pendergast between 1984 and 1994.

Topography
The low-lying area around the site is predominated by red (Rhizophora mangle) and black (Avicennia nitida) mangroves. The site itself is covered by white mangrove (Laguncularia racemosa), gumbo-limbo (Bursera simaruba), white poisonwood (Cameraria belizensis), silver palmettos (Thrinax sp.), cabbage palms (Roystonea oleracea) and a variety of shrubbery. The presence of artefacts beneath the mangal swamps indicates that the site was once larger than what is now exposed.

Surrounded by thick jungle, access to the site is difficult, especially during and immediately after the rainy season. The trails leading there have become increasingly overgrown and visitors are rare.

Ruins

There are at least 49 distinct structures and walls within the mapped area of the site. The structures at the northern end appear to be arranged around plazas, while elsewhere the building plan appears less formal. There are none of the pyramids typical of other Mayan sites in this region.

Building foundations are composed mainly of blocks of Pleistocene limestone that was most likely quarried from local sources. Other building materials include the queen conch Strombus gigas as well as other shells. Crude plaster floors were found in some structures, and evidence suggests that many of the habitations were of pole-and-thatch-roof design.

The site is littered with enormous amounts of broken pottery, as well as conch shells, chert tools and human bones. There is considerable evidence of excessive looting.

History

The excavations conducted by Graham and Pendergast in 1989 indicate that initial occupation of the site occurred about 2,100 years ago, during the late Preclassic period. From then, the site appears to have been continuously inhabited until roughly 1500 CE, at which time it was abruptly abandoned. The peak period of occupation at the site was during the Postclassic period, from about 1200 to 1400 CE.

The Maya inhabitants are believed to have been predominantly fisherfolk and later, during the late Classic period (from about 800–500 CE), involved in intensive salt production. Evidence suggests that, during this period, the inhabitants of Marco Gonzalez traded extensively with other Maya sites. The abundant pottery that litters the site is made from mixtures of clay and quartz; since there is no available source of these materials on Ambergris Caye, they (or perhaps even the pots themselves) must have been brought to the site from overseas. Other artefacts at the site, such as chert and flint tools and other granite artefacts, minor jade and obsidian, were also obviously imported from elsewhere since the materials have no natural source anywhere on Ambergris Caye. The site's setting on the tip of the island may have given it a strategic position on maritime trade routes that existed at the time.

Theories on abandonment
In 1993, a geological history of southern Ambergris Caye and the Marco Gonzalez area was published by R.K. Dunn and S.J. Mazzullo, which provides a theory as to why the site was abruptly abandoned around 500 years ago. A representative cross-section of the site revealed evidence that, between roughly 2000 and 1000 years ago, the coastal geography changed from open, shallow sea to mangal swampland.

Rapid rising in sea levels caused by the melting of the last Pleistocene glaciers caused the geography of the coastal area around Marco Gonzalez to change. As sea levels rose, the coastline shifted to shelter the surrounding area from currents, allowing mangrove swamps to completely surround the site. Eventually, the encroachment of the surrounding jungle and swamplands made the site inhospitable, and the Maya abandoned it.

The discovery of artefacts below present sea level, and beneath the mangrove peats, indicated that the habitable area of the site was much larger in the past than now; and subsequently that the inhabitants moved to progressively higher ground as sea level rose and the swamps encroached upon them.

Bibliography
Mazzullo, S.J. "Marco Gonzales". Casado Internet Group. Retrieved 2011-04-21.

Further reading
Dunn, R.K. and Mazzullo, S.J. (1993). "Holocene paleocoastal reconstruction and its relationship to Marco Gonzalez, Ambergris Caye, Belize" in Journal of Field Archaeology, v. 20, p. 121-131.
Graham, E. and Pendergast, D.M. (1987). "Cays to the kingdom" in Archaeological Newsletter of the Royal Ontario Museum, II, v. 18, p. 1-4.
Graham, E. and Pendergast, D.M. (1989). "Excavations at the Marco Gonzalez Site, Ambergris Cay, Belize, 1986" in Journal of Field Archaeology, v. 16, p. 1-16.
Pendergast, D.M. and Graham, E. (1987). "No site too small: The ROM's Marco Gonzalez Excavations in Belize" in Rotunda, v. 20, p. 34-40.
Pendergast, D.M. and Graham, E. (1990). "An island paradise(??): Marco Gonzalez 1990" in Archaeological Newsletter of the Royal Ontario Museum, II, v. 41, p. 1-4.

External links 
 Marco Gonzalez Reserve Official website

Maya sites in Belize
Former populated places in Belize
Populated places established in the 1st century BC
1st-century BC establishments in the Maya civilization
1st-century BC establishments in Belize
Populated places disestablished in the 14th century
1984 archaeological discoveries
14th-century disestablishments in the Maya civilization
14th-century disestablishments in Belize